Geeta J. Narlikar is an Indian–American biochemist who is Professor and the Lewis and Ruth Cozen Chair at the University of California, San Francisco. Her research considers epigenetic regulation and genome organisation. She was elected a Member of the National Academy of Sciences in 2021.

Early life and education 
Narlikar was born in India. She was an undergraduate student in chemistry at the IIT Bombay. After completing her master's degree, she moved to the United States as a graduate student at Stanford University, where she studied RNA folding and biological catalysis. Narlikar left California for the East Coast of the United States, joining Harvard Medical School as a postdoctoral researcher.

Research and career 
Narlikar researches the fundamental processes that underpin epigenetic mechanisms. In particular, she is interested in how nanoscale molecular motors make use of chemical energy to mechanically disrupt the genome. Beyond molecular motors, Narlikar studies the receptor-like behaviour of nucleosomes. Prior to the work of Narlikar, it was assumed that nucleosomes acted as stable and rigid docking sites for DNA. These nucleosomes change shape to regulate access to the underlying DNA. She uncovered the role of HP1a proteins in sequestering part of the genome (heterochromatinthat) and the role of liquid-liquid phase separation in nucleus reorganisation.

In 2014, Narlikar started to teach a summer course on Chromatin, Epigenetics, and Gene Expression at the Cold Spring Harbor Laboratory.

Awards and honours 
 2006 Beckman Young Investigator Award
 2008 Lymphoma Society Scholar Award 
 2011 University of California, San Francisco Outstanding Faculty Mentorship Award
 2018 Biological Mechanisms of Ageing Glenn Award for Research
 2018 IIT Bombay Distinguished Alumnus Award
 2021 Elected Fellow of the National Academy of Sciences

Selected publications

References 

Members of the United States National Academy of Sciences
IIT Bombay
Stanford University alumni
American people of Marathi descent
Year of birth missing (living people)
Living people